A stripped book is a mass market paperback that has been stripped of its cover in order to be recycled. The covers are returned to the publisher as evidence that the books have been destroyed and to obtain a credit on the purchase price.  The books are meant to be destroyed by pulping but some find their way to street merchants, presumably by illegal means, and are resold.

See also 
 Out-of-print book
 Remaindered book

References 

Book publishing
Book terminology
Books by type
Industrial processes
Pulp and paper industry